Speaker of the Delhi Legislative Assembly is the presiding officer of the Legislative Assembly of NCT Delhi, the main law-making body for the Delhi. He is elected by the members of the Delhi Legislative Assembly. The speaker is always a member of the Legislative Assembly.

Ram Niwas Goel is the 7th and current speaker of the Delhi Legislative Assembly, having assumed office on 23 February 2015.

List of the Speakers 
Ram Niwas Goel of Aam Aadmi Party is the incumbent speaker of the Delhi Legislative Assembly since 2015.

List of the Deputy Speakers 
The deputy speaker act as the presiding officer in case of leave or absence caused by death or illness of the Speaker of the legislative assembly.

References 

Speakers of the Delhi Legislative Assembly